Gustav Tögel (24 October 1907 – February 1981) was an Austrian international footballer.

References

1907 births
1981 deaths
Association football forwards
Austrian footballers
Austria international footballers
First Vienna FC players
FC Nancy players
Ligue 2 players
Austrian expatriate footballers
Austrian expatriate sportspeople in France
Expatriate footballers in France
Expatriate footballers in Switzerland
Austrian expatriate sportspeople in Switzerland